A Bloody Battle for Revenge is a 1992 South Korean action film directed, written by, and starring Lee Kyung-kyu. This film is often cited as an example of failure in movie industry in South Korea.

1992 films
1990s Korean-language films
1992 action films
South Korean action films